The volcanic winter of 536 was the most severe and protracted episode of climatic cooling in the Northern Hemisphere in the last 2,000 years. The volcanic winter was caused by at least three simultaneous eruptions of uncertain origin, with several possible locations proposed in various continents. Most contemporary accounts of the volcanic winter are from authors in Constantinople, the capital of the Eastern Roman Empire, although the impact of the cooler temperatures extended beyond Europe. Modern scholarship has determined that in early AD 536 (or possibly late 535), an eruption ejected massive amounts of sulfate aerosols into the atmosphere, which reduced the solar radiation reaching the Earth's surface and cooled the atmosphere for several years. In March 536, Constantinople began experiencing darkened skies and cooler temperatures.

Summer temperatures in 536 fell by as much as 2.5 degrees Celsius (4.5 Fahrenheit degrees) below normal in Europe. The lingering impact of the volcanic winter of 536 was augmented in 539–540, when another volcanic eruption caused summer temperatures to decline as much as 2.7 degrees Celsius (4.9 Fahrenheit degrees) below normal in Europe. There is evidence of still another volcanic eruption in 547 which would have extended the cooler period. The volcanic eruptions, which began in 541, caused crop failures, and were accompanied by the Plague of Justinian, famine, and millions of deaths and initiated the Late Antique Little Ice Age, which lasted from 536 to 560.

The medieval scholar Michael McCormick wrote that 536 was the worst year in history to be alive: "It was the beginning of one of the worst periods to be alive, if not the worst year."

Documentary evidence 
The Roman historian Procopius recorded in AD 536 in his report on the wars with the Vandals, "during this year a most dread portent took place. For the sun gave forth its light without brightness... and it seemed exceedingly like the sun in eclipse, for the beams it shed were not clear".

In 538, the Roman statesman Cassiodorus described the following to one of his subordinates in letter 25:

 The sun's rays were weak, and they appeared a "bluish" colour.
 At noon, no shadows from people were visible on the ground.
 The heat from the sun was feeble.
 The moon, even when full, was "empty of splendour"
 "A winter without storms, a spring without mildness, and a summer without heat"
 Prolonged frost and unseasonable drought
 The seasons "seem to be all jumbled up together"
 The sky is described as "blended with alien elements" just like cloudy weather, except prolonged. It was "stretched like a hide across the sky" and prevented the "true colours" of the sun and moon from being seen, along with the sun's warmth.
 Frosts during harvest, which made apples harden and grapes sour.
 The need to use stored food to last through the situation.
 Subsequent letters (no. 26 and 27) discuss plans to relieve a widespread famine.

Michael the Syrian (1126–1199), a patriarch of the Syriac Orthodox Church, reported that during 536–537 the sun shone feebly for a year and a half.

The Gaelic Irish Annals recorded the following:
 "A failure of bread in AD 536 AD" – the Annals of Ulster
 "A failure of bread from AD 536–539" – the Annals of Inisfallen

The mid-10th-century Annales Cambriae record for the year 537:

 "The Battle of Camlann, in which Arthur and Medraut fell, and there was great mortality in Britain and Ireland."

Further phenomena were reported by independent contemporary sources:
 Low temperatures, even snow during the summer (snow reportedly fell in August in China, which caused the harvest there to be delayed)
 Widespread crop failures
 "A dense, dry fog" in the Middle East, China and Europe
 Drought in Peru, which affected the Moche culture

There are other sources of evidence regarding this period.

Scientific evidence 
Tree ring analysis by the dendrochronologist Mike Baillie, of the Queen's University of Belfast, shows abnormally little growth in Irish oak in 536 and another sharp drop in 542, after a partial recovery.  Ice cores from Greenland and Antarctica show evidence of substantial sulfate deposits in around 534 ± 2, which is evidence of an extensive acidic dust veil.

Possible explanations 
It was originally theorized that the climatic changes of AD 536 were caused by either volcanic eruptions (a phenomenon known as "volcanic winter") or impact events (meteorite or comet).

In 2015, revision of polar ice core chronologies dated a major sulfate deposits and a cryptotephra layer to the exact year AD 536 (previously dated to AD 529 before revision). This is strong evidence that a large explosive volcanic eruption caused the observed dimming and cooling, removing the need for an extraterrestrial explanation, but an impact event around this time period cannot be ruled out.

The source of volcanic eruption remains to be found but several proposed volcanoes have been rejected:

 R. B. Stothers postulated the volcano Rabaul in New Britain, in Papua New Guinea. The eruption is now thought to have occurred in the interval AD 667–699 based on wiggle-match radiocarbon dating.
 David Keys suggested the volcano Krakatoa by shifting a cataclysm in AD 416 recorded in Javanese Book of Kings to AD 535. Drilling projects in Sunda Strait ruled out any possibility that an eruption took place during this time period.
 Robert Dull and colleagues proposed the large VEI-7, Tierra Blanca Joven (TBJ) eruption of the Ilopango caldera. Identification of TBJ tephra in ice cores narrowed the eruption date to AD 429–433.
 Loveluck and his colleagues proposed Icelandic volcanos based on the shards from Swiss glacier. However, the cryptotephras dated exactly to AD 536 is geochemically distinct from Icelandic tephra, and shards in Swiss glacier have large age uncertainty.

Geochemical analysis of AD 536 cryptotephras distinguishes at least three synchronous eruptive events in North America. Further analysis correlates one of the eruptions to a widespread Mono Craters tephra identified in northeast America. The other two eruptions most likely originated from the eastern Aleutians and Northern Cordilleran volcanic province.

Historic consequences 

The 536 event and ensuing famine have been suggested as an explanation for the deposition of hoards of gold by Scandinavian elites at the end of the Migration Period. The gold was possibly a sacrifice to appease the gods and get the sunlight back. Mythological events such as the Fimbulwinter and Ragnarök are theorised to be based on the cultural memory of the event.

A book written by David Keys speculates that the climate changes contributed to various developments, such as the emergence of the Plague of Justinian (541–549), the decline of the Avars, the migration of Mongol tribes towards the west, the end of the Sassanid Empire, the collapse of the Gupta Empire, the rise of Islam, the expansion of Turkic tribes, and the fall of Teotihuacán. In 2000, a 3BM Television production (for WNET and Channel Four) capitalised upon Keys' book. The documentary, under the name Catastrophe! How the World Changed, was broadcast in the US as part of PBS's Secrets of the Dead series.
However, Keys and Wohletz's ideas lack mainstream acceptance. Reviewing Keys' book, British archaeologist Ken Dark commented that "much of the apparent evidence presented in the book is highly debatable, based on poor sources or simply incorrect. [...] Nonetheless, both the global scope and the emphasis on the 6th century AD as a time of wide-ranging change are notable, and the book contains some obscure information that will be new to many. However, it fails to demonstrate its central thesis and does not offer a convincing explanation for the many changes discussed".

The philologist Andrew Breeze in a recent book (2020) argues that some King Arthur events, including the Battle of Camlann, are historical by happening in 537 as a consequence of the famine associated with the climate change of the previous year.

See also 
 1257 Samalas eruption
 1452/1453 mystery eruption
 1815 eruption of Mount Tambora, largest ever recorded
946 eruption of Paektu Mountain
 Fimbulwinter
 Great Famine of 1315–1317
 Justinian I, Roman emperor at the time
 Laki
 Minoan eruption
 Tierra Blanca Joven eruption
 Volcanism of Iceland
 Year Without a Summer, 1816

Notes

References

Further reading 
 
 
 
 
 
 
 
 
 Levy, David (ed.), The Scientific American Book of the Cosmos, 2000,  (Google Print, p. 186)

External links 
 "536 and all that", from Real Climate, March 2008.
 CCNet Debate: The AD 536–540 Mystery: Global Catastrophe, Regional Event or Modern Myth?

535
536
6th century in Asia
6th century in Europe
6th century in North America
6th-century natural disasters
Anomalous weather
Events that forced the climate
Medieval weather events
6th-century famines
Volcanic winters